Eduardo Pérez (born 6 March 1957) is a Mexican former freestyle swimmer who competed in the 1976 Summer Olympics.

References

1957 births
Living people
Mexican male freestyle swimmers
Olympic swimmers of Mexico
Swimmers at the 1975 Pan American Games
Swimmers at the 1976 Summer Olympics
Pan American Games bronze medalists for Mexico
Pan American Games medalists in swimming
Competitors at the 1978 Central American and Caribbean Games
Central American and Caribbean Games gold medalists for Mexico
Central American and Caribbean Games medalists in swimming
Medalists at the 1975 Pan American Games
20th-century Mexican people
21st-century Mexican people